Saurauia lanceolata is a species of plant in the Actinidiaceae family. It is endemic to Java in Indonesia.

References

lanceolata
Endemic flora of Java
Vulnerable plants
Taxonomy articles created by Polbot